The Diocese of Lucknow is a diocese of the Church of North India, headquartered in the city of Allahabad. The jurisdiction of the diocese mainly covers the Eastern side of Uttar Pradesh.

History
The diocese of Lucknow was established in 1893 by carving it out from the Diocese of Calcutta. The diocese was given the name of Lucknow although the mother Cathedral, All Saints Cathedral and diocesan headquarters stayed in Allahabad. It was because Allahabad was situated within the legally defined territories of the diocese of Calcutta. It is the biggest Diocese in Uttar Pradesh and one of the oldest dioceses in north India.

Bishops

The Bishop of Lucknow was the Ordinary of the Anglican Diocese of Lucknow from its inception in 1893 until the foundation of the Church in India, Pakistan, Burma and Ceylon in 1927 and its consequent merger with other Protestant Churches to form the Church of North India in 1970; and since then head of one of the united church's biggest dioceses.
Late Rt. Rev. Lord Alfred Clifford 1893–1910
Late Most. Rev. Lord George Westcott 1910–1928
Late Rt. Rev. Lord Charles Saunders 1928–1938
Late Rt. Rev. Lord Sydney Bill 1939–1947
Late Rt. Rev. Lord Christopher Robinson 1947–1962
Church of North India
Late Rt. Rev. Lord Joseph Amritanand 1962–1970
Late Most Rev. Lord Deen Dayal 1970–1976
Late Rt. Rev. Raja Yousef
Rt. Rev. Anil R. Stephen
Rt. Rev. Morris Edgar Dan – defrocked in 2013
Late Rt. Rev. Dr. Colin Christopher Theodore – Moderator's Episcopal Commissary
Rev. Daniel Subhan – Moderator's Commissary
Rt. Rev. Dr. Peter Baldev – Sent on long leave w.e.f. June, 2022
Rt. Rev. Manoj Charan - Moderator's Episcopal Commissary - Resigned
Rt. Rev. Andrew Rathod - Moderator's Episcopal Commissary - present

References

External links
Church of North India

 
1893 establishments in India
Church of North India
Anglican dioceses in Asia
Christianity in Uttar Pradesh